The following is a timeline of the history of the city of Munich, Germany.

Prior to 17th century

 1158 - Duke Henry the Lion builds bridge, mint, and salt-depot.
 1175 - Munich gains official status as city.
 1239 - Coat of arms of Munich in use.
 1240 - Otto II Wittelsbach in power.
 1255 - City becomes ducal residence of Upper Bavaria.
 1327
 .
 City then rebuilt by Louis the Bavarian
 1368
 Cathedral construction begins.
 St. Peter's Church reconstructed.
 1383 - Löwenbräu founded.
 1385 - Munich Residenz built.
 1394 - Town Hall built.
 1397 - Guild uprising.
 1429 - Fire.
 1482 - Johann Schauer sets up printing press.
 1494 - Frauenkirche consecrated.  
 1506 - City becomes capital of Bavaria.
 1576 - Jesuit school built (approximate date).

17th-18th centuries
 1609 - Catholic League founded.
 1617 - Hofgarten laid out.
 1623 - Schleissheim Palace constructed.
 1628 - Treaty of Munich signed.
 1632 - City occupied by Gustavus Adolphus of Sweden.
 1634 - Bubonic plague.
 1638 - Mary's Column erected, Marienplatz.
 1653 - State opera active.
 1675 - Nymphenburg Palace built.  
 1680 - Population: 20,000  
 1688 - Premiere of Steffani's opera Niobe.
 1690 - Theatine Church built.
 1705 - Sendlinger Mordweihnacht.
 1739 - Amalienburg built.
 1742 - Habsburgs in power.
 1753 - Cuvilliés Theatre built.
 1759 - Bavarian Academy of Sciences and Humanities founded.  
 1762
 28 April: Fire.
 Hoforchester active.
 1781 - Premiere of Mozart's opera Idomeneo.
 1783 - Population: 38,000. 
 1789 - Englischer Garten laid out by Count Rumford.
 1797 - Charitable soup kitchen begins operating.
 1800 - 2 July: City taken by French forces.

19th century

 1801 - Population - 48,885.  
 1806 - City becomes capital of Kingdom of Bavaria.
 1807
 Viktualienmarkt active.
 Hofgartenkaserne built.
 Augustiner-Keller beer garden in business.
 1808 - Royal Academy of Fine Arts established.
 1809 - Alte Münze in use.
 1810 -  (Oktoberfest) begins.
 1818
 National Theatre built.
 Lese-Konditorei (reading cafe) in business.
 1825 - Accession of Ludwig I of Bavaria leads to "handsome streets and buildings".  

 1826
 Ludwig Maximilian University relocates to Munich.
 Türkenkaserne built.
 1830
 Ludwigstraße laid out (approximate date).
 Glyptothek built.
 1835 - St. Boniface's Abbey founded by Ludwig I of Bavaria.
 1836 - Alte Pinakothek established.
 1837 - Allerheiligen-Hofkirche built.
 1839 - Train station opens.
 1843
 State Library building constructed.
 Paläontologisches Museum established.
 1844
 Ludwigskirche consecrated.
 Feldherrnhalle constructed.
 1848 - München Hauptbahnhof relocated.
 1853
 Maximilianstraße laid out.
 Neue Pinakothek established.
 1854 - Glaspalast built; city hosts General German Industrial Exhibition.
 1855 - Bavarian National Museum founded.
 1861 - Population: 148,201.
 1862 - Propylaea constructed.
 1865 - Premiere of Wagner's opera Tristan und Isolde.
 1867 - Royal Bavarian Music School established.
 1868 
 State Museum of Ethnology founded.
 Technical University of Munich opened.
 1869 - Museum für Abgüsse Klassischer Bildwerke created.
 1871
 Haidhausen station and München Süd station open.
 Population: 169,693.
 1875 - Munich Opera Festival begins.
 1876 - Trams in Munich runs by horsecar.
 1878 - Munich Pasing station relocated.
 1879
 Bavarian Army Museum founded.
 Over 28 million gallons of beer were brewed in Munich.  
 1880
 Bürgerliches Brauhaus formed.
 Population: 230,023.  
 1882 - Allgemeine Zeitung moved to Munich. 
 1885
 Bürgerbräukeller (beer hall) in business.
 Population: 261,982.
 1887
 Hofatelier Elvira founded.
  opens.
 1888 - Munich Stadtmuseum established.
 1889 - Eisenbahnkaserne built.

 1890 - Population: 350,594.
 1892
  (hospital) opens.
  formed.
 1893
  active.
 Kaim Orchestra formed.
 1894 -Production of Hildebrand & Wolfmüller motorcycle begins.
 1895
 Trams in Munich electrified.
 Population: 407,174.
 1896 - Simplicissimus magazine begins publication.
 1898 - City hosts Kraft- und Arbeitsmaschinen-Ausstellung.
 1900
 FC Bayern Munich founded.
  opens.

20th century

1900–1945

 1901
 Franz Eher publisher in business.
 Prinzregententheater opens.
 1902 - Anthropologisch-Prähistorisches Sammlung des Staates formed.
 1903 - Deutsches Museum von Meisterwerken der Naturwissenschaft und Technik founded.
 1904 - Heinrich Thannhauser's art gallery opens.
 1905 - Population: 538,983.
 1906 - City co-hosts the 1906 World Figure Skating Championships.
 1908 - New Town Hall built; Rathaus-Glockenspiel installed.
 1909
 Neue Künstlervereinigung München founded.
 Modern Gallery of contemporary art and Schackgalerie open.
 1910 – 12 September: Premiere of Mahler's Symphony No. 8.
 1911
 Hellabrunn Zoo opens.
 Der Blaue Reiter art exhibit held.
 1917 - Bayerische Motoren Werke formed.
 1919
 German Workers' Party founded in Munich.
 16 October: Hitler gives his first political speech at the Hofbräukeller.
 City becomes capital of Bavarian Soviet Republic.
 Population: 630,711.
 1920
 July: Consulate of Poland opens.
 Nazi paramilitary Sturmabteilung headquartered in Munich.
 Nazi Völkischer Beobachter newspaper headquartered in Munich.
 1923 - 8–9 November: Nazis attempt coup ("Beer Hall Putsch").
 1925
  (transportation exposition) held in city.
 München Hauptbahnhof electrified.
 1927 - Richard Strauss Conservatory founded.
 1929 - Lenbachhaus museum opens.
 1930
 13 September: Hitler gives campaign speech at the Circus Krone Building, prior to German federal election, 1930 on 14 September.
 Population: 728,900.
 1931 - National Socialist Party headquartered in Brown House.
 1932
 Nazi Sicherheitsdienst (intelligence agency) headquartered in Munich.
 Zoologische Staatssammlung München formed.
 1933
 Nazi headquarters relocated from Munich to Berlin.
 March: Dachau concentration camp begins operating near city.
 1934 - Hunting museum established.
 1935 - Münchner Haus der Kulturinstitute built.

 1937
 Führerbau constructed.
 18 July: House of German Art opens.
 19 July: "Degenerate art" exhibit held in Hofgarten.
 1938
 September: Munich Agreement signed.
 November: Kristallnacht.
 1939
 Munich-Riem Airport opens.
 Population: 829,318.
 1940
 June: Bombing of Munich begins.
 1942
 27 June: White Rose group active.
 17 December: Forced labour camp for men established in the Moosach district.
 1943
 February: Munich-Allach subcamp of the Dachau concentration camp established by the SS.
 Polenlager Ost and Polenlager Süd forced labour subcamps of the local Nazi prison for youth established for young Poles (see also Nazi crimes against the Polish nation).
 1944
 5 August: Forced labour camp for women established in the Berg am Laim district.
 Agfa-Commando subcamp of the Dachau concentration camp established.
 2 December: Forced labour camp for women in Berg am Laim dissolved.

 1945
 13 March: Forced labour camp for men in Moosach dissolved.
 City captured by Americans. Remaining prisoners of the Munich-Allach and Agfa-Commando subcamps liberated.
 AFN Munich begins broadcasting.
 Munich Central Collecting Point set up.
 Denazification.
 Christian Social Union in Bavaria headquartered in Munich.

1946-1990s

 1948 - Bayerische Akademie der Schönen Künste established.
 1949 - Bavarian Radio Symphony Orchestra founded.
 1951 - Residenz Theatre built.
 1952 - Deutsches Brauereimuseum founded.
 1954 - Population: 908,572.
 1955
 Italian Cultural Institute in Munich founded.
 Fast-food Wienerwald (restaurant) in business.
 1958
 6 February: Munich air disaster.
 Population: 1,011,878.
 1959 -  begins.
 1960
 Munich Central Station rebuilt.
 Convair 340 crash.
 1961 - Population: 1,106,298.
 1963 - National Theatre rebuilt.
 1965 - Population: 1,214,603.
 1966
 Staatliche Sammlung für Ägyptische Kunst founded.
 Deutsches Jagdmuseum reopens.
 1967 - Staatliche Antikensammlungen opens.
 1969 - City hosts the 1969 World Table Tennis Championships.
 1970 
 Munich bus attack
 Population: 1,311,978.
 1971 - U-Bahn begins operating.
 1972
 S-Bahn begins operating.
 Olympic Stadium opens; city hosts Summer Olympics; Munich massacre.
 BMW Headquarters is established.
 1973 -  built.
 1974 - City hosts the 1974 World Figure Skating Championships.
 1975 - City co-hosts the 1975 Ice Hockey World Championships.

 1978 - Population: 1,296,970.
 1980 - Museum Witt established; Oktoberfest bombing.
 1983
 April–May: City co-hosts the 1983 Ice Hockey World Championships.
 City hosts Bundesgartenschau (garden show).
 1985 - Gasteig culture center opens.
 1988 - Munich Biennale opera festival begins.
 1989 - Sister city relationship established with Cincinnati, USA.
 1990 - Museum of Man and Nature opens.
 1992
 City hosts 18th G7 summit.
 Museum Villa Stuck opens.
 Munich Airport opens.
 1993
 Bayerische Staatskanzlei built.
 Bayerische Theaterakademie August Everding founded.
 1995 - Eureka Prometheus Project's VaMP driverless car goes to Copenhagen and back.
 1996 - City website online (approximate date).
 1999
 Czech Centre in Munich founded.
 BMW Headquarters declared as protected historical building
 2000 -  formed.

21st century
 2001 - City hosts the 2001 World Judo Championships.
 2002 - Pinakothek der Moderne opens.
 2003 - Goetz Collection opens.
 2005 - Allianz Arena opens.
 2006 - Ohel Jakob synagogue built.
 2007
 Jewish Museum opens.
 Population: 1,311,573.
 2009 - Museum Brandhorst opens.
 2010 - Türkentor restored.
 2012 - March: 2012 Munich artworks discovery.
 2013 - Population: 1,407,836.
 2014 - Dieter Reiter becomes mayor.
 2015
 Migrants arrive.
 NS-Dokumentationszentrum built.
 2016 - Munich shooting occurs.

See also
 History of Munich
 List of mayors of Munich
 Timeline of German history
 Timelines of other cities in the state of Bavaria: Augsburg, Nuremberg, Würzburg

References

This article incorporates information from the German Wikipedia.

Bibliography

in English

in German
  1887-

External links

 Links to fulltext city directories for Munich via Wikisource

Years in Germany
 
Munich
Munich-related lists